Pie IX Bridge is a bridge in Quebec, spanning the Rivière des Prairies. It connects the Saint-Vincent-de-Paul area of Laval, on Île Jésus, and the borough of Montréal-Nord in Montreal, on the Island of Montreal. The bridge was part of Autoroute 25 until the construction of the new toll bridge for Autoroute 25. It is now part of Quebec Route 125.

While it was originally called Le Caron Bridge, after Joseph Le Caron, an early missionary to the Hurons, the bridge has since been renamed Pie IX Bridge, after Pie-IX Boulevard.  The Boulevard itself was named after Pope Pius IX (Pie is the French name for Pius).

See also

List of bridges spanning the Rivière des Prairies
List of crossings of the Rivière des Prairies
List of bridges in Montreal
List of bridges in Canada

References

Bridges in Montreal
Rivière des Prairies
Bridges in Laval, Quebec
Montréal-Nord
Road bridges in Quebec